Jeff Lank (born March 1, 1975) is a Canadian former professional ice hockey player. He played two NHL games with the Philadelphia Flyers during the 1999–2000 season.

Lank was born in Indian Head, Saskatchewan.

Career statistics

External links
 

1975 births
Canadian ice hockey defencemen
Hershey Bears players
Living people
Montreal Canadiens draft picks
Philadelphia Flyers draft picks
Philadelphia Flyers players
Philadelphia Phantoms players
Prince Albert Raiders players